Bolechowice  is a village in the administrative district of Gmina Zabierzów, within Kraków County, Lesser Poland Voivodeship, in southern Poland.

The village has a population of 1,515.

References

Bolechowice